Savalan Rural District is in the Central District of Parsabad County, Ardabil province, Iran. At the census of 2006, its population was 17,320 in 3,554 households; there were 18,175 inhabitants in 4,633 households at the following census of 2011; and in the most recent census of 2016, the population of the rural district was 15,496 in 4,415 households. The largest of its 20 villages was Ajirlu, with 4,259 people.

References 

Parsabad County

Rural Districts of Ardabil Province

Populated places in Ardabil Province

Populated places in Parsabad County